Peter Frederick Ridgway (born 15 July 1972) is a former English cricketer.  Ridgway was a left-handed batsman who bowled right-arm fast-medium.  He was born in Penkhull, Staffordshire.

Ridgway made his debut for Staffordshire County Cricket Club in the 1991 Minor Counties Championship against Durham. He played Minor counties cricket for Staffordshire from 1991 to 1996, which included 11 Minor Counties Championship matches and two MCCA Knockout Trophy matches. In 1995, he made his List A cricket debut against Kent in the NatWest Trophy. He played a further List A match against Derbyshire in the 1996 NatWest Trophy.  In his two List A matches, he scored an unbeaten 47 runs against Derbyshire, while with the ball, he took five wickets at a bowling average of 20.60, with best figures of 4/62.

References

External links

1972 births
Living people
People from Penkhull
Cricketers from Stoke-on-Trent
English cricketers
Staffordshire cricketers